Robotech: The Movie, also called Robotech: The Untold Story, is a 1986 American-Japanese science fiction animated film based on the Robotech TV series and Robotech franchise created by Harmony Gold USA. The film was created by splicing together footage from the Japanese direct-to-video movie Megazone 23 Part I and animated television series Super Dimension Cavalry Southern Cross, and had only a loose connection to the Robotech TV show.

Plot
In the year 1999, the alien spacecraft SDF-1 crashed on Earth, followed ten years later by the alien Zentraedi, seeking to reclaim the vessel for their rulers, the Robotech Masters. The First Robotech War erupted over the vessel, ending with victory for humankind, at the cost of the SDF-1 itself. Now, in 2027, the Robotech Masters themselves arrive in Earth's Solar System, aiming to recover the ship's still-functional mother computer, being studied at Earth's Robotech Research Center in Japan. The Masters launch a covert attack on a small human settlement, killing Colonel B.D. Andrews of the Army of the Southern Cross and secretly replacing him with a clone. Following a disastrous attack by the ASC on the Masters’ flagship, the Andrews clone proposes that the military take charge of use the mother computer to formulate a defense against the Masters.  When his proposal is approved, he secretly begins beaming the contents of the computer's database to the Masters, after which they plan to destroy the Earth.

Suspicious over the military's decision to hide the Masters’ existence from the populous, soldier Todd Harris steals the "MODAT 5" - a mobile terminal remotely connected to the mother computer in the form of a motorcycle - and seeks help from his friend Mark Landry, telling him to contact “Eve”. Troops under the Andrews clone's command accost the pair, and Todd dies in an escape attempt before he can fully explain everything to Mark. Mark manages to escapes with the MODAT 5, but unaware of its true significance, winds up merely using it as a prop in an amateur movie being shot by Kelly, a friend of his girlfriend, aspiring dancer Becky Michaels.

Seeing a music video from popular idol Eve, Mark presumes that she was who Todd wanted to contact and telephones her talk show to tell her about the MODAT. The call is traced by Andrews's men, leading to a freeway chase during which the bike automatically reconfigures into a humanoid mecha form to fend off Mark's attackers. Mark proceeds to sneak into the TV studio from which Eve's show is broadcast and discovers that the singer is not a real person at all, but a holographic projection. Eve explains that she is the artificial intelligence of the SDF-1's computer, and informs Mark of the Masters' plan. Eve leads Mark to the Robotech Research Center, where Mark engages and defeats “Andrews” in a mecha battle, but accidentally lets slip the existence of Kelly's film footage of the MODAT. Escaping, Mark attempts to warn Becky, but his recent distractedness has alienated her, and it is not until he rescues her from being sexually assaulted by an unscrupulous dance show director that the pair reconcile.

ASC forces under the command of Rolf Emerson stage another attack on the Masters’ fleet, and again meet with failure thanks to Andrews using the mother computer to feed them bad data and control their movements. When a concerned technician reports Andrews's suspicious actions to Professor Embry, head of the Ministry of Computer Sciences, the computer is ordered to be shut down. Andrews stages a coup and takes control of the Japanese government, ordering the computer reactivated and the transmission of its database resumed. Amid the chaos of the coup, Kelly is killed by Andrews's men and her film of the MODAT is stolen. Realizing the threat Andrews poses, Embry prepares to depart for Alaska Base, location of a secondary terminal that will allow him to take control of the computer, but is delayed by waiting for his daughter Stacy – Kelly's roommate – to join him.

The Masters’ flagship descends to Earth and they deliver an ultimatum to the ASC, but in doing so, reveal the link between the computer and their vessel. Exploiting the link to discern a weak spot in the Masters’ defenses, the ASC is able to cripple their flagship, and when it crashes, the rest of the fleet retreats. Simultaneously, Mark, seeking revenge, attacks the research center to flush out Andrews. Defeated and left for dead by Andrews, who departs to intercept Embry, Mark is contacted through the wrecked MODAT by Eve, who directs him to commandeer a prototype space fighter that carries him to the airport just in time to save Embry and Stacy from Andrews's attack. Transforming the space fighter to robot mode, Mark has one final battle with Andrews that ends with him killing the clone and triumphantly reuniting with Becky.

Cast
Ryan O'Flannigan - Mark Landry, Strategic Air Command Tech 2, and Additional Voices
Brittany Harlowe - Becky Michaels
Muriel Fargo - Eve
Greg Snow - Colonel B.D. Andrews, and Newscaster 2
Jeffrey Platt - Rolf Emerson, Rider 1, and Additional Voices
Guy Garrett - Anatole Leonard, Red Master Elder 1, and Yellow Master Elder 2
Abe Lasser - Yellow Master Elder 1, Roger, and Red Master Elder 2
Mearle Pearson - Professor Embry
Penny Sweet - Kelley Stevens
Wendee Swan - Stacy Embry

Featured Voices
Wayne Anthony - Green Master Elder, Northern Province Officer, and Additional Voices
Spike Niblick - Additional Voices
Bruce Nielson - Strategic Air Command Soldier 1, Delta Blue, Mark's Buddy 2, Leonard's Subordinate 3, Stunt Rider 4, and Additional Voices
Ike Medlick - Master Subordinate 2, Underground Tech Announcement, and Additional Voices
Ton Warner - Lt. Todd Harris
Jonathan Alexander - MODAT Security Commander
Etienne Bannliett - Frank, Leonard's Subordinate 1, Subordinate with Andrews in Truck 2, Additional Voices
Colin Philips - Underground Tech 2, Northern Province Tech, and Additional Voices
Christopher Frank - Nick
A. Gregory - Pop, Frank Partner, PM, MODAT Security 2nd-in-Command, and Additional Voices
Jaque Maecell - Dr. Peters, Fake Good Samaritan 1
Drew Thomas - Strategic Air Command Colonel, Subordinate with Andrews in Truck 1, Northern Province Cannon Operator, Helix 1, Hangar Soldier 3, and Additional Voices
Max Christian - Major in Andrews' Forces, Additional Voices
Ray Michaels - Government Official, and Captain in Andrews' Forces

Uncredited
Ardwight Chamberlain - Master Subordinate 1, TV Station Tech 1, Todd and Nick's Comrade, Strategic Air Command Tech 1, Newscaster 3, Strategic Air Command Soldier 2
Cam Clarke - Branch Tech 2, and Additional Voices
J. Jay Smith - Narrator

Production
According to interviews with director/producer/co-writer Carl Macek, the project had originally been intended to be more of a straight dub of Megazone 23 with dialogue and music changes to reflect the Robotech universe. As originally conceived, it would have been set concurrently with the events of the first portion of the Robotech television series (while the SDF-1 was in the process of flying back to Earth from Pluto) with the protagonist Mark Landry, a relative of TV series lead character Rick Hunter, finding out about the government's coverup of the SDF-1's fate, and Landry fighting to make the information known.

However, at the time, Tatsunoko Productions was involved in promoting its own Macross movie, Do You Remember Love, and insisted that Macek not use elements of the Macross story, so as to avoid possible confusion. Also, distributor Cannon Films felt there were "too many girls and not enough robots and guns," and did not like Megazone'''s downer ending, either. Thus, Macek rewrote the story to take place in the time-gap between the first and second seasons of the television series, cut segments of Southern Cross footage into it, and commissioned animation studio The Idol Company to animate a new ending (which was later included on the laserdisc of Megazone 23, Part II under the name "Present For You" and on the "Over Seas Edition" bonus DVD of the PlayStation 3 game; Megazone 23: Aoi Garland, along with the unreleased Harmony Gold dub of Part II). The new version involved the Robotech Masters kidnapping and replicating veteran officer B.D. Andrews to steal the memory core of the SDF-1.

Because Megazone 23 (an OVA) and Southern Cross (a TV series) were shot on different film stock, 35mm and 16mm respectively, the visual inconsistency was very noticeable on the big screen.

It was originally intended for the B.D. Andrews character—named "B.D. Edwards" in the original cut—to go on to appear in the sequel animated television series, Robotech II: The Sentinels, which was in the planning stages at the time. However, this became impossible when the film was recut and time frame of the story changed, as Edwards's presence in the new version would have conflicted with his role in The Sentinels. To that end, the character in the film was changed into "B.D. Andrews" and the Sentinels character became "T. R. Edwards." Similarly, Eve was also intended to appear in The Sentinels, but for the same continuity reason, was reworked to become Janice Em.

Music
The Robotech: The Movie soundtrack album by Ulpio Minucci, Arlon Ober and various artists was released only in France and Latin America in 1987. The various records, cassettes and discs of this soundtrack are now considered collectors' items. Michael Bradley's single "Underground", was also released separately by Carrere Records.

Limited release
The movie disappeared from the United States after a failed test-run in Texas that lasted only a few weeks. One cause for its poor performance was believed to be poor advertising (commercials promoting the movie appeared only at 6:00am).

However, the biggest problem by far was the disappointment of fans with the film's extremely tenuous connection with the original series. Another complicating factor was the film's adult themes, which (although not as graphic as in the original Megazone 23) reportedly led some parents to remove their children from theatres before the movie was finished, as many deemed the film's content to be inappropriate for young children. (For example: The main female lead, Becky, was nearly raped at the film's midway point, and there was considerably more violence throughout the film than in the TV series, such as the president being shot in the head on-screen and a man being shown crushed under a car with blood splattered out from underneath.)

In other territories such as Argentina and Belgium, it ran successfully in cinemas and had a VHS release in Spanish (by International Video Entertainment) and with Dutch subtitles (by Vestron Video), respectively. Harmony Gold relinquished its license to Megazone 23 after director Carl Macek washed his hands of the project, so home video releases were limited to the few VHS tapes that had been in limited circulation in Europe and Latin America, are now considered very rare.

Some animatics and other supplemental material were released as extras with ADV Films' Robotech DVD release.

In 2011, A&E Home video released, as part of their Robotech: The Complete Series collection, a 29-minute version of Robotech: The Movie. This version contains only footage used from Southern Cross, with a disclaimer stating the film "has been edited for licensing and content."  The plot focuses mainly on the battles between The Robotech Masters and the Army of The Southern Cross, with the main plot of B.D. Andrews being referred to mostly through dialogue. This version does, however, retain the original end credits of the film, crediting many characters and songs that never appear in it.

Current status
After ADV Films acquired the home video rights to Megazone 23, some fans have held hope that a home video release of Robotech: The Movie would again be possible. However, neither ADV nor any other distributor (including the owners of the Cannon Films library, Metro-Goldwyn-Mayer) has announced plans for a DVD or Blu-ray release of the film. Any potential release of the movie is considered extremely unlikely since the film's original negatives were destroyed in a flood of the studio in the mid-1990s; and a release based on available copies of the movie would likely be of very low quality. However, blackmarket copies of the movie have reportedly made their way onto the Internet due to file sharing. The events of the film are no longer considered part of the official Robotech timeline.The Carl Macek Interview by Todd Hill.

Comic and novel adaptations
 Academy Comics released a comic adaptation of the movie in 1996 written by Benny R. Powell with art by Chia-Chi Wang. The book was a departure from the actual movie, at the request of the publisher. While the first issue borrowed heavily from the source material, the second issue was almost entirely new material. The two-issue series was originally intended to be a longer run, but due to the loss of the license to Antarctic Press, it was vastly condensed. It was among the last Robotech comics published by Academy before the license was moved to Antarctic Press.
 Additionally, elements from the movie were used in the plot of the Robotech novel #20: The Masters' Gambit''.

References

External links

Review of Robotech The Movie at Anime Reviews
Robotech Movie Reviews Spanish

1986 anime films
American animated science fiction films
Animated films based on animated series
Japanese animated science fiction films
Films set in 2027
Mecha anime and manga
Movie, The
1980s American animated films
Golan-Globus films
1980s English-language films
Films edited from television programs

ja:ロボテック#Robotech: The Movie